This is a list of High Sheriffs of Brecknockshire or Breconshire.

The office of High Sheriff of Brecknockshire was established in 1535 since when a High Sheriff was appointed annually by the Queen until 1974 when the office was merged into that of High Sheriff of Powys as part of the creation of Powys from the amalgamation of Montgomeryshire, Radnorshire and Brecknockshire. The Office of High Sheriff remained first in precedence in the County until the reign of Edward VII when an Order in Council in 1908 gave the Lord Lieutenant of Brecknockshire the prime Office under the Crown as the Sovereign's personal representative.

List of sheriffs

17th century

18th century

19th century

20th century

References

 
Brecknockshire
Brecknockshire